John Samuel Wade (3 October 1907 – 11 June 1941) was an Australian rules footballer who played with Port Adelaide in the South Australian National Football League (SANFL) and South Melbourne in the Victorian Football League (VFL). Playing in Port Adelaide's premiership side in 1928, he represented South Australia on four occasions before being recruited by South Melbourne in 1930 — however, he was not granted a clearance to play for South Melbourne until 1931.

The collection of players recruited from interstate in 1932/1933 became known as South Melbourne's "Foreign Legion".

Wade also represented Victoria at badminton.

He was killed in action in Lebanon during World War II.

"In a brief and dignified ceremony before the [Grand Final between Norwood and Sturt on 4 October 1941], the big crowd stood in silence for a minute to honor [the eight] League players who have died on active service in the present war, The chairman of the League (Major E. Millhouse) told spectators that … they were L.K. Rudd (Port Adelaide), D. Waite (West Torrens), D.L. Carlos (Glenelg), H.G. Brock (Port Adelaide), A. Exley (Glenelg), H.R. Farrant (North Adelaide), L. Leahy (Norwood), and J. Wade (Port Adelaide)." -- The Chronicle, 9 October 1941.

See also
 List of Victorian Football League players who died on active service

Footnotes

References

Holmesby, Russell & Main, Jim (2007). The Encyclopedia of AFL Footballers. 7th ed. Melbourne: Bas Publishing.
 Main, J. In the Blood, Bas Publishing, Melbourne. .
 Main, J. & Allen, D., "Wade, Jack", pp. 349–350 in Main, J. & Allen, D., Fallen – The Ultimate Heroes: Footballers Who Never Returned From War, Crown Content, (Melbourne), 2002.
 Australian War Memorial Roll of Honour: Private John Samuel Wade (VX8242).

1907 births
1941 deaths
Australian rules footballers from South Australia
Sydney Swans players
Port Adelaide Football Club (SANFL) players
Port Adelaide Football Club players (all competitions)
Australian military personnel killed in World War II
Australian Army personnel of World War II
Australian Army soldiers
Military personnel from South Australia